Fredenbeck is a Samtgemeinde ("collective municipality") in the district of Stade, in Lower Saxony, Germany. Its seat is in the village Fredenbeck.

The Samtgemeinde Fredenbeck consists of the following municipalities:
Deinste
Fredenbeck
Kutenholz

Samtgemeinden in Lower Saxony